Zanthoxylum rhombifoliolatumis a tree from the Rutaceae family.

Description
Zanthoxylum rhombifoliolatum are shrubs that can stand from 1 to 2 meters tall. It has been found in Chongqing, Guizhou,

Classification
The species was recorded in Acta Phytotax in 1957. It would later be accepted in 2008's Flora of China.

References

rhombifoliolatum